Maja Grykat e Hapëta is a mountain located in northern Albania in the Bjeshkët e Namuna. It is found to the southeast of Maja Jezercë, south of the upper Valbonë valley. Like many of the other mountains surrounding it, Maja Grykat e Hapëta has a stony texture near its summit.

References

Mountains of Albania
Accursed Mountains